In enzymology, a lysine dehydrogenase is an enzyme that catalyzes the chemical reaction

L-lysine + NAD+  1,2-didehydropiperidine-2-carboxylate + NH3 + NADH + H+

Thus, the two substrates of this enzyme are L-lysine and NAD+, whereas its 4 products are 1,2-didehydropiperidine-2-carboxylate, NH3, NADH, and H+.

This enzyme belongs to the family of oxidoreductases, specifically those acting on the CH-NH2 group of donors with NAD+ or NADP+ as acceptor.  The systematic name of this enzyme class is L-lysine:NAD+ oxidoreductase (deaminating, cyclizing).

References

 

EC 1.4.1
NADH-dependent enzymes
Enzymes of unknown structure